Portugal competed at the 2016 Winter Youth Olympics in Lillehammer, Norway from 12 to 21 February 2016.

Alpine skiing

Boys

Girls

See also
Portugal at the 2016 Summer Olympics

References

2016 in Portuguese sport
Nations at the 2016 Winter Youth Olympics
Portugal at the Youth Olympics